The 2018 World Taekwondo Grand Prix was the 6th edition of the World Taekwondo Grand Prix series. This was the first season where it was five Grand Prix events.

Schedule

Men

58 kg

68 kg

80 kg

+80 kg

Women

49 kg

57 kg

67 kg

+67 kg

Medal table
As of GP Final in Fujairah.

See also
 List of sporting events in Taiwan

References

External links
World Taekwondo calendar 

World Taekwondo Grand Prix
Grand Prix